Colin Keay is a retired Scottish and British athlete who won medals at European, Paralympic, and world level. He won five gold medals and one silver medal in C6 athletics across the 1984 Summer Paralympics and 1988 Games.

Born with cerebral palsy and secondary sensory challenges, Keay is described as "the leading T36 athlete on the track during the 80s" by Scottish Disability Sport. He won Paralympic gold in 1984 at three different distances: 60 m, 400 m, and cross country 1000 m, then two more in 1988: the 200 m and 400 m.

References

Paralympic gold medalists for Great Britain
Paralympic silver medalists for Great Britain
Medalists at the 1984 Summer Paralympics
Medalists at the 1988 Summer Paralympics
Paralympic medalists in athletics (track and field)
Athletes (track and field) at the 1984 Summer Paralympics
Athletes (track and field) at the 1988 Summer Paralympics
Paralympic athletes of Great Britain